The Jampa Temple (THL Jampé Lhakhang) or Temple of Maitreya  is located in Bumthang (Jakar) in Bhutan, and is said to be one of the 108 temples built by Tibetan King Songtsen Gampo in 659 CE on a single day, to pin down an ogress to earth forever.

Legend
It was divined that the supine demoness was causing obstruction to the spread of Buddhism, and temples were constructed on her body parts that spread across Tibet, Bhutan and the borderlands. The best known of these temples are Jokhang in Lhasa, Kichu in Paro, Bhutan and Jambay Lhakhang in Bumthang District, Bhutan.

Other, lesser-known temples in Bhutan have been destroyed, but it is believed that, among others, Kongchogsum in Bumthang, Khaine in Lhuntse and two temples in Haa District may have part of these 108 temples. Jambay Lhakhang was visited by Padmasambhava and restored by King Sindhu Raja after the former returned his life force. It has been repaired and rebuilt several times over time.

Notes

Bibliography

Buddhist monasteries in Bhutan
Tibetan Buddhism in Bhutan